Geoff Wall is a retired American soccer midfielder who played professionally in the North American Soccer League, Major Indoor Soccer League and Western Soccer Alliance.

Wall graduated from Ballard High School in 1982.  He was a 1981 Parade Magazine High School All American soccer player.  On December 15, 1981, the Portland Timbers selected Wall in the second round of the NASL draft.  However, the Timbers folded in 1982. and Wall went on trial with AFC Bournemouth for four months.  Wall also played for the U.S. U-19 national soccer team during this time.  On April 29, 1983, he signed with the Seattle Sounders of the North American Soccer League.  He played seven games with the Sounders which folded at the end of the season.  In the fall of 1983, he joined the Tacoma Stars of the Major Indoor Soccer League and played three seasons with them.  In the summer of 1984, Wall played for the Fort Lauderdale Sun in the United Soccer League.  In 1985, he signed with F.C. Seattle of the Western Soccer Alliance and played with them through the 1988 season.

Wall continued to play amateur indoor and outdoor soccer in Seattle and coached youth soccer.  In 1991, he joined the Seattle Fire Department.

References

External links
 NASL/MISL stats

1967 births
Living people
Soccer players from Tacoma, Washington
American soccer coaches
American soccer players
Seattle Storm (soccer) players
Fort Lauderdale Sun players
Major Indoor Soccer League (1978–1992) players
North American Soccer League (1968–1984) players
Seattle Sounders (1974–1983) players
Tacoma Stars players
United Soccer League (1984–85) players
Western Soccer Alliance players
Association football midfielders
American firefighters